Narceus woodruffi is a species of millipede endemic to Florida. Described in 1959, it is the smallest species of the genus Narceus, with adults measuring up to 50 mm in length and 4 mm in width.

See also
Floridobolus, a genus of millipedes also endemic to Florida

References

Millipedes of North America
Spirobolida
Endemic fauna of Florida
Animals described in 1959